The Blackburn Cirrus Midget was a British four-cylinder, inverted, inline air-cooled aero engine designed and built in 1937 by the Cirrus Engine Section of Blackburn Aircraft Limited. Little is known of its development and use, its sole aircraft application being reported as the Chilton D.W.1 although it is possible that this did not transpire.

Specifications (Cirrus Midget)

See also

References

Notes

Bibliography

 Lumsden, Alec. British Piston Engines and their Aircraft. Marlborough, Wiltshire: Airlife Publishing, 2003. .

External links
Announcement of Blackburn Cirrus Midget introduction - Flight, September 1938 
Image of the Blackburn Cirrus Midget - Flight, November 1938

Air-cooled aircraft piston engines
Blackburn aircraft engines
1930s aircraft piston engines
Inverted aircraft piston engines